Marty Beller (born July 10, 1967) is an American musician and songwriter. He is the current drummer for They Might Be Giants since Dan Hickey's departure in 2004. He has recorded two solo albums. He has contributed writing and vocals for three of TMBG's albums: Here Come the ABCs (on "Alphabet Lost And Found"), Here Come the 123s (on "High Five!") and Here Comes Science (on "Speed and Velocity").

On TMBG's 2011 compilation album Album Raises New and Troubling Questions, Beller is referenced in the song "Marty Beller Mask", the lyrics of which suggest that he is actually Whitney Houston wearing a mask. On the news of Houston's death, TMBG decided to phase the song out from public performance.

Personal life
Beller lives in New York and is married to the literary agent Jill Grinberg, and has two children, a daughter named Violet Beller (born 2005), and a son named Noah Beller (born 2008).

References

External links 
 
 Marty Beller at This Might Be a Wiki

Living people
They Might Be Giants members
American rock drummers
1967 births
20th-century American drummers
American male drummers